The ' is a Japanese act that governs the National Health Insurance system operated by Japanese municipalities for residents who are not enrolled in Employees Health Insurance. It was passed by the Diet of Japan on December 27, 1958.

Details
 According to Article 5 of the Act, registered residents of a municipality should be enrolled in National Health Insurance. (NHI)
 According to Article 9, people must register for NHI.
 According to Article 127 the Act allows municipalities to set up a fine of up to 100,000 yen for people who do not comply with the Act.

References

External links
 Full text of the Act 

1958 in law
1958 in Japan